The Blue Ocean is a residential skyscraper located in Tamsui District, New Taipei, Taiwan. Construction began in 2007 and it was completed in 2010. It was the tallest building in Tamsui when completed, until it was surpassed by The Crystal Plaza in 2013. The building offers 180 apartment units, with facilities including a banquet hall, two swimming pools and a fitness center for the residents.

See also 
 List of tallest buildings in Taiwan
 List of tallest buildings in New Taipei City
 Ellipse 360

References

2010 establishments in Taiwan
Apartment buildings in Taiwan
Residential buildings completed in 2010
Residential skyscrapers in Taiwan
Skyscrapers in New Taipei